Stotesbury Club House is a historic clubhouse located at Wyndmoor in Springfield Township, Montgomery County, Pennsylvania.  It was built between 1904 and 1908, for Edward T. Stotesbury (1849-1938) as an equestrian center building. An addition was completed in 1927.  It is a 1 1/2-story, "L"-shaped frame building in the Arts and Crafts style. It has a gable roof and a shingled gable dormer. The front facade features an open porch supported by three Doric order columns and the rear has a raised flat-stone patio. Stotesbury sold the house in 1924.

It was added to the National Register of Historic Places in 1985.

References

Clubhouses on the National Register of Historic Places in Pennsylvania
Buildings and structures completed in 1908
Buildings and structures in Montgomery County, Pennsylvania
National Register of Historic Places in Montgomery County, Pennsylvania
1908 establishments in Pennsylvania